Peter John Slattery (born 6 June 1965 in Brisbane) was a rugby union player playing in the position of scrum-half. He played 17 matches for Australia, and was a starting player during the 1991 Rugby World Cup.

References

Australia international rugby union players
Australian rugby union players
Queensland Reds players
1965 births
Living people
People educated at Brisbane State High School
Rugby union halfbacks
Rugby union players from Brisbane